Padmakshi Temple is one of the oldest temples in the Hanamakonda area of Telangana, India. It is dedicated to the Hindu goddess Padmakshi (Lakshmi), and also features Jain imagery.

The site originally had a Shaivite cave temple, and a Jain shrine was established in 1117 CE, during the rule of the Kakatiya chief Prola II, who was himself a Shaivite. Some time later, the Jain shrine was replaced by a Hindu temple. The Jains attempted to regain control of the site in the 19th century, but a commission set up the Nizam of Hyderabad concluded that the site originally hosted a Hindu shrine.

History

The site originally had a Shaivite cave temple. The artificial caves, located to the west of the present-day temple, were probably carved before the 5th century CE, as they are almost identical to the early Brahmanical caves. A Jain shrine was probably added during the rule of the Chalukyas of Vatapi or the Rashtrakutas.

A 1117 CE inscription found at the temple records the construction of a Jain shrine named Kadalalaya-basadi, and a gift of land to this shrine. The site probably already had Jain presence by this time. Mailama, the wife of the Kakatiya minister Betana-pergada, commissioned the shrine. Medarasa of Ugravadi (Meda II), who held the office of Maha-mandaleshvara, donated the land. Betana was a minister of the Kakatiya chief Prola II, who was a Shaivite and a vassal of the Chalukyas of Kalyani. Ugravadi appears to be the name of a historical region comprising the present-day Mulugu and Narasampet talukas.

Probably sometime after the 1156 CE, the Brahmanical shrine replaced the Jain shrine, possibly due to the influence of the Veerashaivas. In the 19th century, the Jains appealed to the Nizam of Hyderabad to grant them the control of the site, arguing that it was originally a Jain shrine. The Nizam instituted a commission to investigate the Jain claim, and concluded that the earliest shrine at the site belonged to the Hindus. In 1869 CE, the Nizam granted land for the maintenance of the temple.

Architecture
An impressive feature of the temple is the four faces of the Annakonda pillar, which is a quadrangular column made of black granite stone at the temple's entrance.

The temple has rich sculpture of the Jain Tirthankaras and other Jain gods and goddesses.

Once a year, Lakhs of women arrive to celebrate the famous Bathukamma festival and immerse flowers in the pond at the foot of the Padmakshi hillock.

References

Hanamkonda district
Tourist attractions in Warangal
Hindu temples in Telangana
Jain temples in Telangana
12th-century Jain temples
Lakshmi
Lakshmi temples